Slatina is a municipality and village in Nový Jičín District in the Moravian-Silesian Region of the Czech Republic. It has about 800 inhabitants.

Administrative parts
The village of Nový Svět is an administrative part of Slatina.

References

Villages in Nový Jičín District